Ethio-Parents' School is a private school in Bole zone, Woreda 11 in Addis Ababa, Ethiopia. With enrollment of more than 3,000 students, Ethio-Parents' School has students from grade 1 to 12. It is the first private school in Ethiopia that introduced Information and Communication Technology (ICT) as a basic teaching element. The school is managed by HOHETE TIBEB Share Company (HTSC).

History 
Ethio-Parents' School was formed by volunteer parents in 1995. It started with 54 Teachers, 26 Administrative staffs and 300 Students. So far, the school has opened up two branches in Gerji and Gullele. The school has enrolled more than 3000 students from pre-school to college preparatory grades in the two branches. Currently the school has 325 academic staff members.
It is run by a group called 'MSN'. and in grade 9 in 2017/18 academic year.

References 

1995 establishments in Ethiopia
Educational institutions established in 1995
Schools in Addis Ababa
Private schools in Africa